Pseudoclanis is a genus of moths in the family Sphingidae erected by Walter Rothschild in 1894. They are found in sub-Saharan Africa and the southern part of the Arabian Peninsula.

Species
Pseudoclanis abyssinicus (Lucas 1857)
Pseudoclanis aequabilis Darge, 2005
Pseudoclanis axis Darge 1993
Pseudoclanis biokoensis Darge 1991
Pseudoclanis canui Darge 1991
Pseudoclanis diana Gehlen 1922
Pseudoclanis evestigata Kernbach 1955
Pseudoclanis kakamegae Eitschberger, 2007
Pseudoclanis kenyae Clark 1928
Pseudoclanis molitor (Rothschild & Jordan, 1912)
Pseudoclanis occidentalis Rothschild & Jordan 1903
Pseudoclanis postica (Walker 1956)
Pseudoclanis somaliae Eitschberger, 2007
Pseudoclanis tomensis Pierre 1992
Pseudoclanis zairensis Eitschberger, 2007

References

 
Smerinthini
Moth genera
Taxa named by Walter Rothschild